Teresa Jane Kingham (born 4 May 1963) is a British Labour Party politician. She was Member of Parliament (MP) for Gloucester from 1997 to 2001.

Kingham was educated at Dartford Grammar School for Girls, and gained a BA from Royal Holloway, University of London, a PGCE from the University of East Anglia and a master's degree in Egyptian Archaeology from University College London. She is currently studying for a PhD in Biological Anthropology at the University of Kent.

She ran as the Labour candidate for the European Parliament seat of the Cotswolds in 1994, but lost to the long-serving Conservative incumbent MEP, Lord Henry Plumb, however she succeeded in cutting Plumb's majority from 45,678 in 1989 to just 4,268 at that election.

Kingham was elected as MP for Gloucester in 1997, but retired from Parliament in disillusionment after just one term, having complained publicly about the antiquated ways of working in the Palace of Westminster. She later expressed dissatisfaction with the old boys network in the House of Commons, accusing various members of "endlessly thrusting their groins around the Chamber in mock combat" and "indulging in yah-boo nonsense, point-scoring and silly games". Whilst in Parliament, Kingham successfully campaigned to change laws to protect firefighters and to get a nationwide cystic fibrosis screening programme for newborn babies. She was a Member of the International Development Select Committee.

Kingham is married to Mark Luetchford, a civil servant, trustee of War on Want and author of "Waging the War on Want", the official history of the organisation. They have three children.

References

External links

1963 births
Living people
People educated at Dartford Grammar School for Girls
Alumni of Royal Holloway, University of London
Alumni of the University of East Anglia
Alumni of University College London
UK MPs 1997–2001
Labour Party (UK) MPs for English constituencies
Female members of the Parliament of the United Kingdom for English constituencies
Members of Parliament for Gloucester
20th-century British women politicians
21st-century British women politicians
20th-century English women
20th-century English people
21st-century English women
21st-century English people